Earthrise is a concept album originally released in 1985 in the UK (USA 1984), written by former Electric Light Orchestra (ELO) member Richard Tandy and David Morgan, both from Birmingham, UK. Morgan also wrote songs for 1960s band The Move. The album was inspired by the iconic photo of the earth taken during the Apollo 8 mission.

The album's story is about a space explorer who longs to return to his one love on Earth, only to eventually find that true love has always been with him — inside. The album's synthesizer-heavy rock sound is similar to ELO's 1981 album Time. Although the album was well received by ELO fans, it was not a commercial success, largely due to the absence of marketing. Rock Legacy released a remastered special edition on CD in 2011.

On November 9, 2019, to commemorate the 50th year of the moon landings, the Royal Birmingham Conservatoire performed an orchestral version of Earthrise with Tandy and Morgan.

Track listing
The track order of the original 1986 release, on LP and cassette with the FMRevolver label, is:

Original track listing

CD issue
The remastered CD, released on 18 August 2011, contains the following tracks, some of which are previously unreleased or bonus.

Personnel 
Personnel list according to the 1986 reissue liner notes.

Earthrise

 Richard Tandy - keyboards, bass guitar, guitar, producer
 Dave Morgan - keyboards, vocoder, vocals, guitar, producer
 Haydon James Simpson / Jim Simpson - drums, guitar, on "Zero Zero"
 Tony Clarkin - guitar on "Ria"
 Bob Wilson - guitar
 Martin Smith - guitar on Secret (uncredited on re-issue)
 Shirley Miller - backing vocals on "Princeton"
 Carl Wayne - vocals on "Princeton"
 Kevin Peek - guitar on "Princeton"
 Richard Bailey - keyboards, guitar on "Princeton"
  - keyboards, string arrangements on "Princeton"
 David Bellinger - keyboards on "Spaceship Earth"
 Brian Badhams - bass guitar on "Princeton"
 Mike Giles - drums on "Princeton"

Production

 Steve Lipson - engineer, producer
 Chris Bellman - mastering

Release history

References

External links
 Earthrise on Blogspot.
 David Morgan on YouTube.

1984 albums
Electric Light Orchestra
albums produced by Stephen Lipson